Chillanes is a location in the Bolívar Province, Ecuador. It is the seat of the Chillanes Canton.

References 
 www.inec.gov.ec
 www.ame.gov.ec

External links 
 Map of the Bolívar Province

Populated places in Bolívar Province (Ecuador)